Cacek is a surname. Notable people with the surname include:

Craig Cacek (born 1954), American baseball player
P. D. Cacek (born 1951), American author